Adrian Jamal McPherson (born May 8, 1983) is a former gridiron football quarterback. McPherson played the majority of his professional career for the Montreal Alouettes of the Canadian Football League. He was drafted by the New Orleans Saints in the fifth round of the 2005 NFL Draft. He played college football at Florida State before being dismissed from the team as a result of a November 2002 arrest.  As a professional, McPherson has also been a member of the Indiana Firebirds, Utah Blaze, Austin Wranglers, Grand Rapids Rampage, Tampa Bay Storm, Calgary Stampeders, Los Angeles KISS and Toronto Argonauts.

Early years
McPherson is a former Florida Mr. Basketball and Mr. Football Florida (the first athlete to have awarded both honors in Florida history) as a student at Southeast High School in Bradenton, Florida,  He began his career at Florida State playing quarterback on the football team and point guard on the basketball team after attending Southeast High School in Bradenton, Florida, where he was named Gatorade Florida Football Player of the season, passing for 3,728 yards and 42 touchdowns and rushing for 765 yards and 10 touchdowns as a senior at Southeast.  Additionally, he played third base for his American Legion baseball team, which won a state championship in the summer of 2002.

College career and dismissal
McPherson played two seasons (2001–02) at Florida State University. As a true freshman, McPherson appeared in nine games with the Seminoles in 2001, completing 23 of 37 passes for 214 yards and two touchdowns. As a sophomore in 2002, McPherson started four games, completing 80 of 156 passes for 1,017 yards, 12 touchdowns and one interception while rushing for 180 yards on 48 carries. McPherson was dismissed from the football team by Florida State coaches in November 2002 amid reports that police planned to question him in connection with check theft and forgery charges; McPherson was later arrested.

After McPherson's initial arrest in November 2002, additional charges were brought by Florida State university police in March 2003 alleging McPherson's participation in a gambling scheme whereby McPherson placed bets on Florida State football games he participated in.  McPherson pleaded no contest to all charges in connection with both the check fraud and later gambling charges as part of a plea deal in July 2003; McPherson received no jail time in exchange for probation and community service as part of the deal.

Following the plea deal, McPherson briefly attempted to enroll at Tennessee State in August 2003, however, Tennessee State coaches later issued a release stating they had determined it would not be appropriate for McPherson to join the team.

Statistics

Professional career

Indiana Firebirds
Although potentially eligible for the 2004 NFL Draft, amidst potential character concerns expressed by NFL teams, McPherson instead opted to play in the AFL, signing with the Indiana Firebirds of the Arena Football League.  In one season with the Firebirds, McPherson threw for 61 touchdowns against 5 interceptions, adding an additional 19 rushing touchdowns. As a result of his play, McPherson was named the 2004 AFL Rookie of the Year.

New Orleans Saints
McPherson was selected by the New Orleans Saints in the fifth round of the 2005 NFL Draft. As a rookie, McPherson made limited appearances in Saints preseason games prior to the 2005 NFL Season. At the time, the Saints had hoped McPherson could eventually develop into the team's starting quarterback. However, following McPherson's rookie year, the Saints signed free agent quarterback Drew Brees, who went on to lead the Saints to the 2006 NFC Championship Game in his first season with the team.

On August 12, 2006, McPherson was hit by a golf cart driven by the Tennessee Titans mascot during half-time of a preseason game at LP Field. On December 8, 2006, McPherson sued the Titans, seeking $15 million in punitive damages and $5 million in compensatory damages.  Following injuries sustained in the incident, McPherson was cut by the Saints in September 2006.

Utah Blaze / Austin Wranglers
Before McPherson signed with the Saints following the 2005 NFL Draft, he was acquired from the Indiana Firebirds by the new Utah Blaze of the AFL in their 2005 expansion draft. The move was widely considered to be a gamble, considering his unknown status before the NFL's 2005 Draft. Following the NFL draft, McPherson was placed by the AFL on the "other-league exempt list" until further notice. On November 9, 2006, McPherson was activated by the AFL and a week later traded to the Austin Wranglers in exchange for future considerations.

Grand Rapids Rampage
McPherson was signed by the Grand Rapids Rampage in 2007 as a back-up quarterback for Chad Salsbury. That season for the Rampage, he completed 76 of 129 passes for 819 yards and nine touchdowns with four interceptions.

In 2008, McPherson went 27-for-50 for 368 yards and four touchdowns with no interceptions. He was released by the team in April.

Montreal Alouettes
In May 2008, McPherson was signed by the Montreal Alouettes of the Canadian Football League. He debuted with the Alouettes in a CFL pre-season game, on June 12, 2008, against the Toronto Argonauts. He completed four of eight passes for 105 yards, and one touchdown pass. The Alouettes and Argonauts played to a 34-34 tie in Montreal. McPherson spent five seasons as the back up to franchise quarterback Anthony Calvillo, winning the Grey Cup in 2009 and 2010. Two weeks before entering free agency, McPherson was released on February 1, 2013 so that he could pursue offers from other teams.

Tampa Bay Storm
On February 19, 2013, McPherson signed with the Tampa Bay Storm. On May 10, 2013, McPherson broke the AFL record for rushing touchdowns in a season by a quarterback. Two months later McPherson's season ended with a right leg injury.

Calgary Stampeders
In January 2014, McPherson was signed by the Calgary Stampeders of the Canadian Football League.

Los Angeles KISS
On October 28, 2014, McPherson was assigned to the Los Angeles KISS of the AFL.

Toronto Argonauts
After recovering from an injury that he received during his tenure with the LA KISS, McPherson was signed by the Toronto Argonauts on June 13, 2015. However, one year later, he was released by the Argonauts (on Wednesday, June 15, 2016). On July 20, 2016, he was re-signed by the Argonauts; but on August 27, 2016, he was released again.

Jacksonville Sharks
McPherson signed with the Jacksonville Sharks in April 2018. McPherson was released on July 18, 2018.

See also
 List of Arena Football League and National Football League players

References

1983 births
Living people
African-American players of American football
African-American players of Canadian football
American football quarterbacks
Austin Wranglers players
Canadian football quarterbacks
Florida State Seminoles football players
Grand Rapids Rampage players
Indiana Firebirds players
Montreal Alouettes players
Calgary Stampeders players
New Orleans Saints players
Sportspeople from Bradenton, Florida
Utah Blaze players
Tampa Bay Storm players
Los Angeles Kiss players
Toronto Argonauts players
Jacksonville Sharks players